UBINIG (Unnayan Bikalper Nitinirdharoni Gobeshona, the Policy Research for Development Alternatives) is a non-governmental organization based in Dhaka, the capital of Bangladesh. Founded in 1984, the organization has established nine ''vidyaghar (learning places). 

UBINIG's stated goals include equality and justice, diversity, and the promotion of social rights and responsibilities. It
seeks to train communities in environmental concerns, trade policies, family planning, and labor rights, particularly as they apply to women employed in the clothing industry. It has conducted research on the nutritional values of regional food supplies  and made major contributions to the formulation of policies protecting biodiversity in the region.  The organization opposes the use of hybrid seed varieties in the region as requiring burdensome purchase costs along with additional needs for fertilizers, pesticides, and water. In 2008, the organization expressed its opposition to a leading Bangladeshi NGO, BRAC, which promoted hybrid varieties. 

Farida Akhtar is the organization's executive director.

See also
Nayakrishi

References

Non-profit organisations based in Bangladesh
1984 establishments in Bangladesh
Research institutes in Bangladesh
Organisations based in Dhaka